Azhar Hossain (born March 15, 1964) is a former Bangladeshi cricketer who played in 7 ODIs from 1988 to 1990. Though, in and out of the national squad, Azhar was still a very dominant figure in domestic cricket arena throughout the 80's. The highlight of his international career was his 54 against NZ at Sharjah in 1990. That is the first 50 scored by a Bangladeshi in ODI. Later on, in 1999, his nephew Mehrab Hossain became the first Bangladeshi to score a century in ODI (at Dhaka against Zimbabwe). An opening batsman, He also picked up 4 wickets in ODIs bowling gentle off-breaks.

In ICC trophy
Azhar represented Bangladesh in the 1990 ICC Trophy in Netherlands. He scored 83 runs with the bat in 7 innings, with a highest of 28 against the Netherlands. With the ball, he took  7 wickets for 285 runs,
with his best figures,2/24 against Bermuda.

References

1964 births
Living people
Bangladesh One Day International cricketers
Bangladeshi cricketers
Cricketers from Dhaka